Celeste Independent School District is a public school district based in Celeste, Texas located in northeast Hunt County in north East Texas.

 the school district was rated met standard by the Texas Education Agency.

References

External links
Celeste ISD

School districts in Hunt County, Texas